Conasprella marcusi is a species of sea snail, a marine gastropod mollusk in the family Conidae, the cone snails and their allies.

Distribution
This marine species occurs off the Bahamas.

References

External links
 Gastropods.com: Conasprella (Ximeniconus) marcusi

marcusi
Gastropods described in 2016